Drew High School is located at 6237 Garden Walk Boulevard in Riverdale, Georgia, United States. It is part of Clayton County Public Schools. The school's teams are known as the Titans.

References

Public high schools in Georgia (U.S. state)
Schools in Clayton County, Georgia